Wang Hongwei (born in Anyang, Henan) is a Chinese actor. Wang is perhaps best known for his work with director Jia Zhangke. The two men were classmates at the Beijing Film Academy when they began their professional relationship, with Wang starring in Jia's breakthrough short film Xiao Shan Going Home in 1995. Since then, Wang has had roles in nearly all of Jia's films, including starring roles in Jia's debut Xiao Wu and follow-up, Platform.

Given his collaboration with Jia, Wang Hongwei is often considered the director's on-screen alter ego.

Filmography

References

External links 

Wang Hongwei at the Chinese Movie Database

Year of birth missing (living people)
Living people
Beijing Film Academy alumni
Male actors from Henan
People from Anyang
Chinese male film actors